The  is a kei car/city car manufactured by the Japanese automaker Daihatsu since August 1995. The Move is Daihatsu's response to the similarly designed Suzuki Wagon R that was introduced two years earlier in 1993. The Move is built upon the chassis of the Mira but with a taller body.



First generation (L600; 1995) 

The first-generation Move was designed by I.DE.A in Turin, Italy. It was marketed with a 659 cc three-cylinder engine in Japan and with an  ED-20 engine in export markets. The Japanese domestic market models were internally designated L600, or L610 when equipped with four-wheel drive system; export models were internally designated L601. In 1997, a variant marketed as the Move Custom was introduced with larger headlamps and revised front styling, and was available in subsequent generations.

Daihatsu produced more than half a million L600/L610 Move models, mostly in Japan. It was imported to Europe, including the UK; its 1999 successor was not exported to Europe.

The Move was also offered with the turbocharged 659 cc JB-JL all-aluminium four-cylinder engine producing  and using the internal designation L602; this version was only available with front-wheel drive. This four-cylinder version was originally the only version of the Move which was available with a four-speed automatic transmission; in May 1996 this became available with the turbocharged three-cylinder engine and proceeded to gradually spread downwards through the grades. The export model's ED-20 engine produced , offering more torque than the naturally aspirated 660 cc engines due to its larger displacement. The turbocharged engine was not offered in Europe due to its excessive emissions.

Second generation (L900; 1998) 

The second-generation Move was introduced in October 1998 and was also marketed in Malaysia with slight modifications as the Perodua Kenari.

Third generation (L150; 2002) 

The third-generation Move was introduced in October 2002 and has a derivative called Move Latte.

Fourth generation (L175; 2006) 

The fourth-generation Move was introduced in October 2006 and its design was a departure from the boxy look of the previous generations. A KF-VE-type non-turbo engine and a continuously variable transmission (CVT) were available on this model. It has a derivative called Move Conte.

Fifth generation (LA100; 2010) 

The fifth-generation Move was introduced in December 2010. The car is also sold by Subaru as the second-generation  through an OEM agreement.

Daihatsu Move

Subaru Stella

Sixth generation (LA150; 2014) 

The sixth-generation Move was introduced in Japan in December 2014, along with the third-generation Stella. This generation features a lightweight high-rigidity body structure with a reinforced underbody, improved suspension system, and a power mode-switching steering switch that allows drivers to change the control of the engine and CVT at the touch of a button. It has a derivative called Move Canbus.

Fuel economy is claimed at  while turbocharged models (Custom models only) delivering .

Daihatsu Move

Subaru Stella

International markets 
In Malaysia, Perodua manufactures a version of the Move called the Kenari.

In China, the FAW Tianjin joint venture between First Automobile Works and Toyota produces a petrol and electrical version of the Move. The electric version is exported to the US as the Miles ZX40.

The first two generation Moves were also exported to Europe, where they also went by the Japanese market name. Due to poor sales, Daihatsu did not export the third or fourth-generation Moves to Europe, making it strictly a Japanese domestic market model.

References

External links 

  (Move)
  (Move Custom)
  (Stella)

Move
Cars introduced in 1995
2000s cars
2010s cars
2020s cars
Kei cars
Hatchbacks
Front-wheel-drive vehicles
All-wheel-drive vehicles
Vehicles with CVT transmission